Frank Flowers may refer to:
 Frank E. Flowers, Caymanian filmmaker
 SS Frank Flowers, a Liberty ship

See also
 Frank A. Flower, American newspaper editor